The Charlotte Chapel, formerly known as St George's West Church, is a Baptist church located in Shandwick Place, Edinburgh, Scotland. It is affiliated with the Fellowship of Independent Evangelical Churches.

History

The congregation was established in January 1808, when Christopher Anderson, a young Edinburgh businessman, began evangelical work in the Pleasance area of the city. By 1816, his Pleasance church was too small, and he purchased Charlotte Chapel. The chapel was recently vacated by a Qualified congregation which had joined the Scottish Episcopal Church and then moved to St John's Church, on Princes Street.  The original two-storey building seated 750 attendants. Anderson was pastor until 1851, and membership peaked at 232 in 1873, although many more attended services. Membership began to fall due mainly to emigration, and by 1901, the church had no minister and only a small congregation. Joseph Kemp, of Hawick, who was appointed pastor, began a revival, holding open-air meetings in Princes Street. Membership rose once more, and in 1907 plans for a new building were prepared. The Rose Street church building was built at a cost of £7,250 and opened in 1912 with seating for exactly 1000 attendants.

In 2008, during the latter part of pastor Peter Grainger's tenure, the church held its 200th anniversary celebrations over the course of an extended weekend in October. These celebrations included a large cèilidh at an area school, a formal luncheon at the Assembly Rooms on George Street, and a concert by modern hymn writers Kristen and Keith Getty.

During the bicentennial, the church also saw many former members return and guest ministers visit, such as James Moser, Derek Prime, and American-based radio pastor Alistair Begg. Begg, a native of Scotland, was formerly "Pastor's Assistant" to Derek Prime at Charlotte Chapel, beginning in September 1975. He returned to lead the 2008 celebrations, preaching at both the Sunday morning and evening services at the church's former Rose Street location. In addition, a scholarly book exploring the church's history and concluding with the 200th anniversary was later written by "honorary elder and former secretary" Dr. Ian L.S. Balfour entitled "Revival in Rose Street: A history of Charlotte Baptist Chapel, Edinburgh."

Building
In 2013, the St George's West Church (Church of Scotland) closed the building. In May 2016, Charlotte Chapel moved to the redundant St. George's West Church at 58 Shandwick Place.

References

External links
 Charlotte Chapel Official website
 Unashamed Workman - Preaching website of Charlotte Chapel Associate Pastor, Colin Adams
 The Episcopal Congregation of Charlotte Chapel, Edinburgh, 1794-1818. University of Stirling PhD Thesis by Eleanor M Harris

Churches in Edinburgh
Religious organizations established in 1808
Category B listed buildings in Edinburgh
Baptist churches in Scotland
1808 establishments in Scotland
Listed churches in Edinburgh